Wolfgang Strobel (17 October 1896 – 19 April 1945) was a German football forward who played for 1. FC Nürnberg.

Strobel joined Nürnberg in 1917, and went on to win four German football championships with the club. He was also capped four times by the German national team between 1922 and 1924.

During the Second World War, Strobel worked as an auxiliary policeman. He was fatally shot by American soldiers in April 1945.

Honours
 German football championship: 1920, 1921, 1924, 1925

References

External links
 
 

1896 births
1945 deaths
Association football forwards
German footballers
Germany international footballers
1. FC Nürnberg players
German civilians killed in World War II
Deaths by firearm in Germany
Footballers from Nuremberg